Thomas Lynch (born 15 September 1990) is a former professional Australian rules football player who last played for the North Melbourne Football Club in the Australian Football League (AFL), having previously played for  and . Lynch who had not played a game for North Melbourne since signing with the club prior to the 2022 season announced his retirement from North Melbourne on 31 May 2022 to make space for the mid season draft. He played a 158 games at senior level predominantly for the Adelaide Crows where he played. Prior to that he had played six senior games for St Kilda. Lynch was then traded to Adelaide following the 2011 season.

AFL career

St Kilda (2009–2011)
St Kilda's first pick in the 2008 draft, Lynch did not play senior football in 2009. He made his AFL debut in round 18 of the 2010 season against . He had five disposals and was dropped for the following week's match.

Lynch played five games in 2011 and kicked four goals, including two in a game against .

Adelaide (2012–2021)
Lynch played his first game for the Crows in the first round of the 2012 season. He went on to play six games in his first season at the Crows, but became a regular member of the team the next year, playing 17 matches and leading Adelaide's goalkicking with 33 goals. This included a 10-goal game against , making Lynch only the third player to score ten or more goals in a game for Adelaide.

Lynch established himself in Adelaide's forward line in 2015, playing all 23 games, kicking 32 goals and having 30 goal assists, the most for the season by any player. Late in the season he signed a new three-year contract with the Crows.

In Round 7 of 2017, he was tackled to the ground heavily by  player Jarrad Waite in the second quarter, getting concussed and not being able to return to the ground for the rest of the match. Later in the season Lynch was hospitalized with viral meningitis, but he bounced back from it in Round 17 against , managing 27 possessions, 11 marks and three goals for the match.

He was not offered a contract by Adelaide for the 2022 season and was delisted at the conclusion of the 2021 season.

North Melbourne (2022)
After being delisted by Adelaide, Lynch joined North Melbourne as a development coach in November 2021. He was later signed to the club's list ahead of the 2022 AFL season as part of the supplemental selection period (SSP). Lynch officially retired from playing on 31 May 2022.

Personal life
Lynch is an ambassador for the RSPCA greyhound adoption plan. He has 11 ex-racing greyhounds.

Statistics
 Statistics are correct to end of season, 2017

|- style="background:#eaeaea;"
! scope="row" style="text-align:center" | 2010
| style="text-align:center" | 
| 29 || 1 || 0 || 1 || 3 || 2 || 5 || 3 || 0 || 0.0 || 1.0 || 3.0 || 2.0 || 5.0 || 3.0 || 0.0
|-
! scope="row" style="text-align:center" | 2011
| style="text-align:center" | 
| 29 || 5 || 4 || 1 || 28 || 26 || 54 || 16 || 13 || 0.8 || 0.2 || 5.6 || 5.2 || 10.8 || 3.2 || 2.6
|- style="background:#eaeaea;"
! scope="row" style="text-align:center" | 2012
| style="text-align:center" | 
| 27 || 6 || 7 || 5 || 50 || 9 || 59 || 31 || 8 || 1.2 || 0.8 || 8.3 || 1.5 || 9.8 || 5.2 || 1.3
|- 
! scope="row" style="text-align:center" | 2013
| style="text-align:center" | 
| 27 || 17 || 33 || 20 || 199 || 95 || 294 || 125 || 31 || 1.9 || 1.2 || 11.7 || 5.6 || 17.3 || 7.4 || 1.8
|- style="background:#eaeaea;"
! scope="row" style="text-align:center" | 2014
| style="text-align:center" | 
| 27 || 8 || 7 || 7 || 68 || 41 || 109 || 35 || 13 || 0.9 || 0.9 || 8.5 || 5.1 || 13.6 || 4.4 || 1.6
|- 
! scope="row" style="text-align:center" | 2015
| style="text-align:center" | 
| 27 || 23 || 32 || 16 || 292 || 143 || 435 || 158 || 43 || 1.4 || 0.7 || 12.7 || 6.2 || 18.9 || 6.9 || 1.9
|- style="background:#eaeaea;"
! scope="row" style="text-align:center" | 2016
| style="text-align:center" | 
| 27 || 23 || 42 || 21 || 277 || 171 || 448 || 150 || 45 || 1.8 || 0.9 || 12.0 || 7.4 || 19.4 || 6.5 || 2.0
|- 
! scope="row" style="text-align:center" | 2017
| style="text-align:center" | 
| 27 || 23 || 31 || 23 || 297 || 175 || 472 || 163 || 50 || 1.4 || 1.0 || 12.9 || 7.6 || 20.5 || 7.1 || 2.2
|- class="sortbottom"
! colspan=3| Career
! 106
! 156
! 94
! 1214
! 662
! 1876
! 681
! 153
! 1.5
! 0.9
! 11.5
! 6.2
! 17.7
! 6.4
! 1.4
|}

References

External links

1990 births
Living people
People educated at Haileybury (Melbourne)
Australian rules footballers from Victoria (Australia)
St Kilda Football Club players
Sandringham Dragons players
Adelaide Football Club players
Glenelg Football Club players
Adelaide Football Club (SANFL) players
Sandringham Football Club players